This is a list of township-level divisions of the municipality of Shanghai, People's Republic of China (PRC). 

After province, prefecture, and county-level divisions, township-level divisions constitute the formal fourth-level administrative divisions of the PRC. However, as Shanghai is a province-level municipality, the prefecture-level divisions are absent and so county-level divisions are at the second level, and township-level divisions are at the third level of administration. This list is organised by the county-level divisions of the municipality. As of 8 January 2016, there are a total of 104 subdistricts, 107 towns and 2 townships in Shanghai, excluding special township-level divisions.

Baoshan District
Baoshan District has three subdistricts, nine towns and one special township-level division.

Changning District
Changning District has nine subdistricts and one town.

Fengxian District
Fengxian District has one subdistrict, eight towns and four special township-level divisions.

Hongkou District
Hongkou District has eight subdistricts.

Huangpu District
Huangpu District has ten subdistricts.

Note: Nanshi District and Luwan District were merged with the former Huangpu District in June 2000 and June 2011 respectively to form the current Huangpu District

Jiading District
Jiading District has four subdistricts, seven towns and one special township-level division.

Jing'an District
Jing'an District has thirteen subdistricts and one town.

Note: Zhabei District was merged with the old Jing'an District to form the current Jing'an District in late 2015.

Jinshan District
Jinshan District has one subdistrict, nine towns and one special township-level division.

Minhang District
Minhang District has four subdistricts, nine towns and one special township-level division. 

Note: Shanghai County was merged with the old Minhang District to form the current Minhang District in 1992.

Pudong New Area
Pudong New Area has twelve subdistricts, twenty-four towns and six special township-level divisions.

 * – Liuzao Town merged into Chuanshaxin Town.
 ** – Luchaogang Town and Shengang Subdistrict merged and form Nanhui Xincheng Town.
Note: Nanhui District and Chuansha County were merged with the Pudong New Area in May 2009 and 1993 respectively to form the current Pudong New Area.

Putuo District
Putuo District has eight subdistricts and two towns.

Qingpu District
Qingpu District has three subdistricts and eight towns.

 * – Qingdong Farm (Shanghai Prison for New Prisoners) is affiliated to Shanghai Prison Administration.

Songjiang District
Songjiang District has six subdistricts, eleven towns and three special township-level divisions.

Xuhui District
Xuhui District has twelve subdistricts, one town and one special township-level division.

Yangpu District
Yangpu District has eleven subdistricts and one town.

Chongming District
Chongming District has sixteen towns, three special township-level divisions and two townships.

References

External links

 
Shanghai
Townships
Shanghai-related lists